Waipatu  is a semi-rural suburb of Hastings, in the Hastings District and Hawke's Bay Region of New Zealand's North Island.

Demographics

Tomoana statistical area had a population of 306 at the 2018 New Zealand census, an increase of 69 people (29.1%) since the 2013 census, and an increase of 36 people (13.3%) since the 2006 census. There were 90 households, comprising 147 males and 162 females, giving a sex ratio of 0.91 males per female. The median age was 36.1 years (compared with 37.4 years nationally), with 75 people (24.5%) aged under 15 years, 48 (15.7%) aged 15 to 29, 153 (50.0%) aged 30 to 64, and 30 (9.8%) aged 65 or older.

Ethnicities were 51.0% European/Pākehā, 53.9% Māori, 11.8% Pacific peoples, 2.0% Asian, and 1.0% other ethnicities. People may identify with more than one ethnicity.

The percentage of people born overseas was 19.6, compared with 27.1% nationally.

Although some people chose not to answer the census's question about religious affiliation, 43.1% had no religion, 44.1% were Christian, 4.9% had Māori religious beliefs, 1.0% were Buddhist and 2.9% had other religions.

Of those at least 15 years old, 39 (16.9%) people had a bachelor's or higher degree, and 33 (14.3%) people had no formal qualifications. The median income was $28,600, compared with $31,800 nationally. 24 people (10.4%) earned over $70,000 compared to 17.2% nationally. The employment status of those at least 15 was that 120 (51.9%) people were employed full-time, 42 (18.2%) were part-time, and 3 (1.3%) were unemployed.

Marae

The community has two marae, belonging to the Ngāti Kahungunu hapū of Ngāti Hāwea and Ngati Hōri: Ruahāpia Marae and Karaitiana Takamoana meeting house, and Waipatu Marae and Heretaunga meeting house.

In October 2020, the Government committed $6,020,910 from the Provincial Growth Fund to upgrade a group of 18 marae, including both Ruahāpia and Waipatu. The funding was expected to create 39 jobs.

References

Suburbs of Hastings, New Zealand
Populated places in the Hawke's Bay Region